Heritable family names were generally adopted rather late within Scandinavia. Nobility were the first to take names that would be passed on from one generation to the next. Later, clergy, artisans and merchants in cities took heritable names. Family names (surnames) were still used together with primary patronyms (father's name plus an affix denoting relationship), which were used by all social classes. This meant that most families until modern times did not have surnames. Scandinavian patronyms were generally derived from the father's given name with the addition of a suffix meaning 'son' or 'daughter' or by occupation like Møller - ( Miller ) naming tradition remained commonly used throughout the Scandinavian countries during the time of surname formation.
Forms of the patronymic suffixes include: -son, -sen, -fen, -søn, -ler, -zen, -zon/zoon, and -sson  .

Denmark
The most common Danish family name surnames are patronymic and end in -sen; for example Rasmussen, originally meaning "son of Rasmus" (Rasmus' son). Descendants of Danish or Norwegian immigrants to the United States frequently have similar names ending in the suffix "-sen" or have changed the spelling to "-son". 
Approximately one-third of the Danish population bear one of the ten most common surnames. More than two-thirds have a patronym ending in -sen in their full name. Many of these patronymics are, however, very rare, local or testimony of unusual descent, e.g. Heilesen from Northern Jutland, Holdensen and Boldsen from the former Duchy of Schleswig or Common etymological classes of surnames are occupational (e.g., Møller - miller, Schmidt - smith, and Fisker - fisher, for example names taken after a village or farmstead inhabited by ancestors.

Other higher class people took heritable surnames during the following centuries, clergy often Latinized names (e.g. Pontoppidan made from Broby) and artisans often Germanized names. Naming acts applying to all citizens were issued 1771 (for the Duchy of Schleswig only) and in 1828. The rural population only reluctantly gave up the traditional primary patronyms. Several naming acts replaced the first; in 1856, 1904, 1961, 1981, 2005. The result of the first act was that most people took a patronymic surname as their heritable family name, with the overwhelming dominance of a few surnames as a consequence. Later acts have attempted to motivate people to change to surnames that would allow safer identification of individuals.

In the table, the top surnames in Denmark are listed as of 1971, 2012 and 2022. In 2016, longtime most popular name Jensen was overtaken by Nielsen. The general tendency over the past century has been to give up the commonest names and adopt less frequently-used ones.

Norway

Norwegian surnames were originally patronymic and similar to the surnames used in modern Iceland, consisting of the father's name and one of the suffixes "-sen"/"-son" (son) or "-datter"/"-dotter" (daughter), depending on the person's gender. Unlike modern surnames (family names), they were specific to a person and were not transferred to a person's children. Before 1500, hereditary surnames (family names) were almost unheard except among a few, select elite families. For a long time after that, they were inconsistently used and only found in the upper strata (often urban) of society. As late as 1801, only 2,2% of the rural population in Western Norway had a hereditary surname. Starting in the 16th century, use of hereditary surnames slowly grew in the cities. Around a fourth of the population of Bergen had hereditary surnames by the end of the 17th century, a number which had grown to about 40% by the early 19th century. After this, the use of hereditary surnames in the cities accelerated—by 1865, the vast majority of citizens of Trondheim had hereditary surnames, and by the beginning of the 20th century most of the urban population in Norway had hereditary surnames, although non-hereditary patronymics were often used in addition to the family name. The 19th century saw large-scale migration from rural to urban areas, and migrating families often adopted a formerly non-hereditary patronymic as their family name during the move. Around the turn of the century, the common use of hereditary family names became common in rural areas too. In rural areas, toponymic surnames—usually derived from the name of a farm—were a common alternative to adopting a patronymic as the hereditary family name. Finally, a law passed in 1923 ordered that all newborn children should be assigned a hereditary family name at birth, but did not force people who still did not have a family name to adopt one.

Most Norwegian toponymic surnames derive from farm names, and these farms were frequently named after the geographical features of the farm's location. Many farm names and thus surnames derive from just one word describing the most obvious or distinguishing geographical feature of their location (such as "Dal", meaning "valley"), while others again are compounds of several words describing the farm's location or geographical features (such as "Solberg", meaning "sunny mountain/hill"). Example of surnames deriving from farm names include "Bakke"/"Bakken" (hill or rise), "Berg"/"Berge" (mountain or hill), "Dahl"/"Dal" (valley), "Haugen" or "Haugan" (hill or mound), "Lie" (side of a valley), "Moen" (meadow), "Rud" (clearing), "Vik" (bay or inlet), and "Hagen" (pasture). As Norwegian orthography has undergone substantial standardisation and change since surnames were made mandatory, toponymic surnames are commonly spelt in archaic ways. For example, the surnames "Wiik" and "Wiig" are common variant spellings of "Vik" with well over a thousand people bearing each surname, and "Viik", "Vig", "Viig" and "Wig" (among others) are additional, less common variants of the same name. Similar archaic variants exist of many other Norwegian toponymic surnames.

Today, surnames derived from patronymics are decreasing in popularity in favour of surnames derived from toponyms. In 2009, 22.4% of the Norwegian population had a surname with the suffix "-sen", while among the newborns of 2009 the share was down to 18.4%. The decline of patronymic-derived surnames is not a new phenomenon – the early 20th century saw a similar shift in the frequency of surnames, caused by demographic changes due to successive waves of migration from rural to urban areas. For example, the proportion of the population of Bergen bearing a patronymic-derived family name decreased by half in the forty years after 1900. The following table lists the 20 most common Norwegian surnames as of 2013:

Sweden

The most common surnames in Sweden are originally patronymic. Family names ending with the suffix  "sson" are the most common names in Sweden. In 1901, the Names Adoption Act was passed, which abolished the patronymic practice. From 1901, everyone had to have a family name that was passed down to the next generation. 

Many family names consist of items from nature, for example Lind/Lindberg (linden/lime + mountain), Berg/Bergkvist (mountain/mountain + twig), Alström/Ahlström (alder + stream), or Dahl/Dahlin (valley). Sometimes the first part of such a composite name refers to the family's place of origin e.g. the Strindberg family originating from Strinne; the second part being just ornamental. Families also frequently have military-oriented names such as Skarpsvärd (sharp sword), Sköld (shield) and Stolt (proud). Those names were originally assigned to soldiers under the military allotment system in effect from the 16th century. As in Denmark, the clergy Latinized their names up to about the 18th century, e.g. Linnaeus. Due to the greater diversity of these names each specific name is less common than most patronymic names.

The listing of 20 most commonly Swedish surnames as of December 31, 2012. Different spellings are included in every name but the name is presented by the most common spelling:

See also 
 Icelandic name
 List of most common surnames in Europe

References

External links 
 The 100 most common surnames in Denmark 
Most Common Surnames in Sweden
Most Common Surnames in Norway

Surnames
Germanic-language surnames